Franco Rodrigo Vaccaro (born 8 June 1997) is an Argentine professional footballer who plays as a forward.

Career
Vaccaro started his career with Alumni de Puerto Madryn before joining Guillermo Brown of Primera B Nacional. He made his senior bow in the Copa Argentina in July 2018, featuring for fifty-six minutes of a 1–0 defeat to Primera División team Tigre. In 2019, Vaccaro featured in the Torneo Regional Federal Amateur for Juan José Moreno; scoring once in twelve appearances.

Career statistics
.

References

External links

1997 births
Living people
People from Puerto Madryn
Argentine footballers
Association football forwards
Guillermo Brown footballers